Pultenaea canescens, commonly known as plumed bush-pea, is a species of flowering plant in the family Fabaceae and is endemic to a small area in eastern New South Wales. It is an erect shrub with narrow elliptic to narrow egg-shaped leaves, and yellow to orange flowers with reddish-brown markings.

Description 
The standard petal is yellow to orange with reddish-brown stripes, and the wings and keel are yellow to orange.

Taxonomy and naming 
Pultenaea canescens was first formally described in 1825 by Allan Cunningham in Barron Field's Geographical Memoirs on New South Wales. The specific epithet (canescens) means "somewhat white or hoary".

Distribution and habitat 
Plumed bush-pea grows in swampy heath in the higher Blue Mountains of New South Wales.

References 

canescens
Flora of New South Wales
Taxa named by Allan Cunningham (botanist)
Plants described in 1825